Terrestricythere is a genus of crustaceans belonging to the monotypic family Terrestricytheridae.

The species of this genus are found in Japan.

Species:

Terrestricythere crimaea 
Terrestricythere elisabethae 
Terrestricythere ivanovae 
Terrestricythere pratenesis 
Terrestricythere proboscidis

References

Podocopida